Martin John Robinson (born 17 July 1957 in Ilford) was an English professional footballer who scored over 100 league goals in a career spanning over 15 years.

Starting his career as an apprentice with Tottenham Hotspur in 1975, he made just 6 appearances for the London club, scoring twice in 3 seasons at White Hart Lane.

He made a name for himself as a striker when moving across London to Charlton Athletic where he managed 58 goals in 228 games. After a brief loan spell at Reading (6 appearances, 2 goals), he hit his most prolific form when signed for Gillingham as he netted 23 goals in 96 games for the Priestfield club.

A spell at Southend United followed where he managed 14 goals, the last of which being his 100th league goal. He wound down his professional career with a season at Cambridge United where he made 16 appearances, scoring one league goal. He also scored the winning goal for the club in a League Cup second round, first leg game against First Division Derby County, beating England goalkeeper Peter Shilton.

After leaving the Abbey Stadium Robinson had a spell with Enfield.

References

1957 births
Living people
Tottenham Hotspur F.C. players
Charlton Athletic F.C. players
Reading F.C. players
Gillingham F.C. players
Southend United F.C. players
Cambridge United F.C. players
Enfield F.C. players
Footballers from Ilford
English footballers
Association football forwards